An artificial neural network (ANN) combines biological principles with advanced statistics to solve problems in domains such as pattern recognition and game-play. ANNs adopt the basic model of neuron analogues connected to each other in a variety of ways.

Structure

Neuron 
A neuron with label  receiving an input  from predecessor neurons consists of the following components:

 an activation , the neuron's state, depending on a discrete time parameter,
 an optional threshold , which stays fixed unless changed by learning,

 

 and an output function  computing the output from the activation

 

Often the output function is simply the identity function.

An input neuron has no predecessor but serves as input interface for the whole network. Similarly an output neuron has no successor and thus serves as output interface of the whole network.

Propagation function 
The propagation function computes the input  to the neuron  from the outputs and typically has the form

Bias 
A bias term can be added, changing the form to the following:

  where  is a bias.

Neural networks as functions 
Neural network models can be viewed as defining a function that takes an input (observation) and produces an output (decision).

Sometimes models are intimately associated with a particular learning rule. A common use of the phrase "ANN model" is really the definition of a class of such functions (where members of the class are obtained by varying parameters, connection weights, or specifics of the architecture such as the number of neurons, number of layers or their connectivity).

Mathematically, a neuron's network function  is defined as a composition of other functions , that can further be decomposed into other functions. This can be conveniently represented as a network structure, with arrows depicting the dependencies between functions. A widely used type of composition is the nonlinear weighted sum, where , where  (commonly referred to as the activation function) is some predefined function, such as the hyperbolic tangent, sigmoid function, softmax function, or rectifier function. The important characteristic of the activation function is that it provides a smooth transition as input values change, i.e. a small change in input produces a small change in output. The following refers to a collection of functions  as a vector .

These can be interpreted in two ways.

The first view is the functional view: the input  is transformed into a 3-dimensional vector , which is then transformed into a 2-dimensional vector , which is finally transformed into . This view is most commonly encountered in the context of optimization.

The second view is the probabilistic view: the random variable  depends upon the random variable , which depends upon , which depends upon the random variable . This view is most commonly encountered in the context of graphical models.

The two views are largely equivalent. This naturally enables a degree of parallelism in the implementation.

Networks such as the previous one are commonly called feedforward, because their graph is a directed acyclic graph. Networks with cycles are commonly called recurrent. Such networks are commonly depicted in the manner shown at the top of the figure, where  is shown as dependent upon itself. However, an implied temporal dependence is not shown.

Backpropagation 
Backpropagation training algorithms fall into three categories:

 steepest descent (with variable learning rate and momentum, resilient backpropagation);
 quasi-Newton (Broyden–Fletcher–Goldfarb–Shanno, one step secant);
 Levenberg–Marquardt and conjugate gradient (Fletcher–Reeves update, Polak–Ribiére update, Powell–Beale restart, scaled conjugate gradient).

Algorithm 
Let  be a network with  connections,  inputs and  outputs.

These are called inputs, outputs and weights, respectively.

The network corresponds to a function  which, given a weight , maps an input  to an output .

In supervised learning, a sequence of training examples  produces a sequence of weights  starting from some initial weight , usually chosen at random.

The output of the algorithm is then , giving a new function . The computation is the same in each step, hence only the case  is described.

This makes  the minimizing weight found by gradient descent.

Learning pseudocode 

The learning algorithm can be divided into two phases: propagation and weight update.

Propagation 
Propagation involves the following steps:

 Propagation forward through the network to generate the output value(s)
 Calculation of the cost (error term)
 Propagation of the output activations back through the network using the training pattern target to generate the deltas (the difference between the targeted and actual output values) of all output and hidden neurons.

Weight update 
For each weight:

 Multiply the weight's output delta and input activation to find the gradient of the weight.
 Subtract the ratio (percentage) of the weight's gradient from the weight.

The learning rate is the ratio (percentage) that influences the speed and quality of learning. The greater the ratio, the faster the neuron trains, but the lower the ratio, the more accurate the training. The sign of the gradient of a weight indicates whether the error varies directly with or inversely to the weight. Therefore, the weight must be updated in the opposite direction, "descending" the gradient.

Learning is repeated (on new batches) until the network performs adequately.

Pseudocode 
Pseudocode for a stochastic gradient descent algorithm for training a three-layer network (one hidden layer):

 initialize network weights (often small random values)
 do
     for each training example named ex do
         prediction = neural-net-output(network, ex)  // forward pass
         actual = teacher-output(ex)
         compute error (prediction - actual) at the output units
           // backward pass
            // backward pass continued
         update network weights // input layer not modified by error estimate
 until error rate becomes acceptably low
 return the network

The lines labeled "backward pass" can be implemented using the backpropagation algorithm, which calculates the gradient of the error of the network regarding the network's modifiable weights.

References 

Computational statistics
 
Classification algorithms
Computational neuroscience